The 2005 season was the Green Bay Packers' 85th in the National Football League (NFL) and their 87th overall. It would be the first season the franchise would have involving quarterback Aaron Rodgers. 

They failed to improve their overall record of 10–6 from 2004 and were ousted from the playoffs for the first time since 2000. It was also the Packers' worst record since their 1991 season.

The Packers suffered injuries to wide receivers Javon Walker and Robert Ferguson and running backs Ahman Green, Najeh Davenport, Tony Fisher, and Samkon Gado. As a result of the lackluster season, most of the Packers coaches were fired, including head coach Mike Sherman.

Offseason
The Packers lost veteran guards Marco Rivera (Dallas Cowboys) and Mike Wahle (Carolina Panthers) to free agency. Starting safety Darren Sharper was released by Green Bay Packers, signing with the Minnesota Vikings. With the 24th pick of the 2005 NFL Draft the Green Bay Packers selected quarterback Aaron Rodgers, the second quarterback taken in the draft. Rodgers became the Packers' starting QB in the 2008 season after Brett Favre's trade to the New York Jets and has since become a four-time NFL MVP and he led the Packers to victory in Super Bowl XLV.

NFL Draft

 Players highlighted in yellow indicate players selected to the Pro Bowl during their NFL career.

Undrafted free agents

Personnel

Staff

Roster

Regular season

Schedule

Week 1: at Detroit Lions

The Packers opened the 2005 NFL season with a loss to the Detroit Lions. Starting wide receiver Javon Walker injured his right knee and did not play the rest of the season. This would be the Lions last win over the Packers until the 2010 season.

Week 2: vs. Cleveland Browns

The Packers lost this game to the Cleveland Browns as quarterback Trent Dilfer threw for 336 yards. The Packers retired the great Reggie White's number 92 at halftime after his unexpected death in December 2004.

Week 3: vs. Tampa Bay Buccaneers

The Tampa Bay Buccaneers won this close game as Carnell Williams rushed for 158 yards. Packers kicker Ryan Longwell missed an extra point and a field goal. It was the Bucs' first victory at Lambeau Field since 1989. It was also the Packers first 0–3 start since 1988

Week 4: at Carolina Panthers

The Carolina Panthers caused the worst start in 17 years for the Packers as they could not complete a fourth quarter comeback to win the game. The Packers lost promising rookie Terrence Murphy in a career-ending helmet to helmet collision on a kickoff return.

Week 5: vs. New Orleans Saints

After starting the season 0–4, the Packers defeat the New Orleans Saints in this blowout. Running back Najeh Davenport ended his season with an ankle injury in the second quarter. This was the largest blowout in Brett Favre's career.

This game marked the first NFL game that Aaron Rodgers played.

Week 7: at Minnesota Vikings

The Minnesota Vikings scored 23 second-half points after being shut out 17–0 in the first half. Paul Edinger kicked a career-long 56-yard field goal as time ran out to win the game. Packers running back Ahman Green ended his season with a career-threatening knee injury.

Week 8: at Cincinnati Bengals

Brett Favre threw five interceptions as the Cincinnati Bengals won this close game. It is also noteworthy for the fact that a fan ran onto the field in the closing moments of the 4th quarter and disrupted the game by taking the ball away from Favre.

Week 9: vs. Pittsburgh Steelers

The Pittsburgh Steelers, who were held without a third down conversion, forced three turnovers that turned into 17 points to help them defeat the Packers. Packers running back Samkon Gado scored his first career touchdown and ended the day with 62 yards.

Week 10: at Atlanta Falcons

 
 
 
 
 
 
 
 
 
 
 

On his 24th birthday, running back Samkon Gado made his first career start against the Atlanta Falcons and finished the day with 103 yards and three touchdowns to help the Packers win their second game of the year.

Week 11: vs. Minnesota Vikings

The Minnesota Vikings won their second game against the Packers with another field goal as time expired. The Packers had only 21 yards rushing.

Week 12: at Philadelphia Eagles

The Philadelphia Eagles beat the Packers as backup quarterback Mike McMahon led his team to victory.

Week 13: at Chicago Bears

The Chicago Bears beat the Packers at Soldier Field for the first time since 1993.

Week 14: vs. Detroit Lions

Samkon Gado helped the Packers win this overtime game over the Detroit Lions by rushing for 171 yards and a touchdown.

Week 15: at Baltimore Ravens

The Baltimore Ravens beat the Packers by 45 points as Kyle Boller passes for 253 yards and three touchdowns.

Week 16: vs. Chicago Bears

The Chicago Bears sweep the Packers for the first time since 1991 with this victory.

Week 17: vs. Seattle Seahawks

The Packers win their last game of the season over the Seattle Seahawks. Packer fans gave Brett Favre a standing ovation at the beginning and end of the game as it was possibly his last game, which turned out not to be the case.

Standings

Season statistical leaders 
 Passing yards: Brett Favre 3,881 Yards
 Passing touchdowns: Brett Favre 20 TD
 QB rating: Brett Favre, 70.9
 Rushing yards: Samkon Gado, 582 Yards
 Rushing touchdowns: Samkon Gado, 6 TD
 Receiving yards: Donald Driver, 1,221 Yards
 Receiving touchdowns: Donald Driver, 5 TD
 Points: Ryan Longwell, 90 points
 Kickoff return yards: Ahmad Carroll, 390 Yards
 Punt return yards: Antonio Chatman, 381 Yards
 Tackles: Nick Barnett, 91 Tackles
 Sacks: Kabeer Gbaja-Biamila, 8.0 Sacks
 Interceptions: Al Harris, 3 Interceptions

NFC leaders
 Brett Favre, NFC leader, Attempts (607)
 Brett Favre, NFC leader, Completions (372)
 Brett Favre, NFC leader, Passing yards (3,881)
 Brett Favre, NFC leader (tied), Interceptions (29)

References

External links
 2005 Green Bay Packers at Pro-Football-Reference.com

Green Bay Packers
Green Bay Packers seasons
Green Bay Packers